Choristostigma plumbosignalis is a moth in the family Crambidae. It was described by Charles H. Fernald in 1888. It is found in North America, where it has been recorded from British Columbia and Alberta to Arizona and New Mexico, east to South Dakota. The habitat consists of grassland coulees, the aspen parkland, as well as wooded areas in boreal forests and mountainous areas.

The wingspan is 20–21 mm. The forewings are sulphur yellow with a light purplish Y shape overlaid with lead colored scales. The hindwings are off white, slightly tinged with yellow on the outer margin. Adults are on wing from June to August.

References

Moths described in 1888
Spilomelinae